Cindy Lamoureux (born November 13, 1991) is a Canadian provincial politician, who was elected as the Member of the Legislative Assembly of Manitoba for the riding of Burrows in the 2016 election. She defeated NDP incumbent Melanie Wight, who had held the riding since the 2011 election.

She is from an active political family in western Canada. She is the daughter of federal Member of Parliament Kevin Lamoureux, and her uncle Darrin Lamoureux previously served as the leader of the Saskatchewan Liberal Party.

On April 21, 2017, she announced that she was running to become the leader of the Manitoba Liberal Party. Former Manitoba Liberal leader and longtime MLA Jon Gerrard and entrepreneur and teacher Dougald Lamont also contested the leadership. Lamoureux led on the first ballot at the leadership election but lost to Lamont on the second ballot.

She was reelected in the 2019 Manitoba general election, in which she shifted from Burrows to the neighbouring constituency of Tyndall Park. Gerrard and Lamont were the only other two Liberals elected, winning their respective constituencies of River Heights and St. Boniface.

References

Living people
1991 births
Franco-Manitoban people
Manitoba Liberal Party MLAs
Politicians from Winnipeg
Women MLAs in Manitoba
21st-century Canadian politicians
21st-century Canadian women politicians